Money is a 2019 South Korean action crime film directed and written by Park Noo-ri. The film stars Ryu Jun-yeol, Yoo Ji-tae and Jo Woo-jin.

Plot
About a young man who dreams of becoming rich. He becomes a stockbroker but soon he finds himself caught up in a stock market scam.

Cast
Ryu Jun-yeol as Jo Il-hyun
Yoo Ji-tae as Beon Ho-pyo / The Ticket
Jo Woo-jin as Han Ji-chul
Kim Jae-young as Jun Woo-sung
Won Jin-ah as Park Si-eun
Jin Seon-kyu as Park Chang-goo
Oh Hee-joon as Stock company unemployed man
Daniel Henney (cameo)

Production 
Principal photography began on May 12, 2017, and ended on August 29, 2017.

References

External links

2019 films
2019 crime action films
South Korean crime action films
Films based on South Korean novels
Showbox films
2010s South Korean films